Abdurahman Ali (Arabic:عبد الرحمن علي) (born 2 January 1993) is an Emirati footballer. He currently plays as a defender for Dibba Al Fujairah.

References

External links
 

Emirati footballers
1993 births
Living people
Al Shabab Al Arabi Club Dubai players
Al-Wasl F.C. players
Dibba FC players
UAE Pro League players
Association football defenders